Jean-Pierre Grédy, often anglicised as Gredy (16 August 1920 – 6 February 2022) was a French playwright.

Biography
After studying literature and law, Grédy entered IDHEC because he wanted to write screenplays.

He wrote the screenplay for the film Julie de Carneilhan, based on a 1941 novel by the French writer Colette, directed by Jacques Manuel and starring Edwige Feuillère. He then met Pierre Barillet with whom he wrote "for fun" Le Don d'Adèle, which was an unexpected success, exceeding a thousand performances and receiving the Tristan-Bernard prize. Over the next several decades, Grédy and Barillet wrote more than 20 plays together. Certain of their plays were adapted to Broadway, including  Fleur de cactus (Cactus Flower, written by Abe Burrows) and Quarante carats (Forty Carats).

Grédy died on 6 February 2022, at the age of 101.

Works

Film adaptations (selected)
, directed by Émile Couzinet (France, 1951, based on the play Le Don d'Adèle)
, directed by André Hunebelle (France, 1958, based on the play Ami-ami)
Cactus Flower, directed by Gene Saks (USA, 1969, based on the play Fleur de cactus)
40 Carats, directed by Milton Katselas (USA, 1973, based on the play Quarante carats)
Potiche, directed by François Ozon (France, 2010, based on the play Potiche)
Just Go with It, directed by Dennis Dugan (USA, 2011, based on the play Fleur de cactus)

Screenwriter
 Beauties of the Night (dir. René Clair, 1952)

References

External links
 
 
 
 Jean-Pierre Grédy at Les Archives du spectacle 

1920 births
2022 deaths
20th-century French dramatists and playwrights
French centenarians
Men centenarians
People from Alexandria